Brandon Stewart (born May 16, 1986) is a professional Canadian football defensive back for the Montreal Alouettes of the Canadian Football League (CFL). Stewart began his career with the Calgary Stampeders, recording two tackles in two games over a two-year span. On February 24, 2009, Stewart signed as a free agent with the Winnipeg Blue Bombers and spent five seasons with the club. Upon becoming a free agent again, he signed with the Hamilton Tiger-Cats on February 11, 2014. He spent two years with the Tiger-Cats before entering free agency again and signing a two-year deal with the Lions on February 9, 2016. Following his release from BC, he signed with the Alouettes on July 10, 2017.

References

External links
 Montreal Alouettes bio
 BC Lions bio

1986 births
Living people
Players of Canadian football from Seattle
Canadian football defensive backs
Eastern Arizona Gila Monsters football players
Calgary Stampeders players
Winnipeg Blue Bombers players
Hamilton Tiger-Cats players
BC Lions players
Montreal Alouettes players